Somabrachys arcanaria is a moth in the Somabrachyidae family. It was described by Pierre Millière in 1884.

References

Zygaenoidea
Moths described in 1884